HMR may refer to:

 HMR, the IATA code for Hamar Airport, Stafsberg, in Norway
 HMR, the ICAO code for NAC Air, a Canadian airline
 HMR, the ISO 639-3 code for the Hmar language of India
 .17 HMR, a rimfire rifle cartridge

As an abbreviation
 Health Management Resources
 High Mountain Rangers, a television series
 Hoboken Manufacturers Railroad
 Hoechst Marion Roussel, an American subsidiary of Hoechst AG
 Hot module replacement, web technology
 Housing Market Renewal Initiative, in the United Kingdom
 Hyderabad Metro Rail